Bad Therapy is an original novel written by Matthew Jones and based on the long-running British science fiction television series Doctor Who. It features the Seventh Doctor, Chris and Peri.

Synopsis

1950s London, the Soho district seems to be just the thing to recover from recent traumatic events in the 30th century. It's not to be, as a rash of violence shakes the city. A driverless cab is killing people, others with no past are being slain in bizarre rituals, crime is running rampant, gangs are fighting for territory and deep in an abandoned mental hospital an evil psychiatrist is laying plans.

External links

1996 British novels
1996 science fiction novels
Virgin New Adventures
Novels by Matt Jones
Seventh Doctor novels
Novels set in the 1950s
Novels set in London
Fiction set in 1958